The women's discus throw event at the 1992 World Junior Championships in Athletics was held in Seoul, Korea, at Olympic Stadium on 19 and 20 September.

Medalists

Results

Final
20 September

Qualifications
19 Sep

Group A

Group B

Participation
According to an unofficial count, 20 athletes from 15 countries participated in the event.

References

Discus throw
Discus throw at the World Athletics U20 Championships